Fritz Pregl (3 September 1869 – 13 December 1930), was a Slovenian-Austrian chemist and physician from a mixed Slovene-German-speaking background. He won the Nobel Prize in Chemistry in 1923 for making important contributions to quantitative organic microanalysis, one of which was the improvement of the combustion train technique for elemental analysis.

Biography

Pregl was born in Ljubljana within Austria-Hungary to a Slovene-speaking father and German-speaking mother. He was baptized Friedrich Michael Raimund Pregl. He died in Graz, Austria in 1930.

Pregl started his career as chemist after he studied medicine at the University of Graz. With his focus on physiology and especially chemical physiology, he suffered from the limitations of quantitative organic microanalysis. The small quantities of substances he obtained during the research of bile acid made it necessary to improve the process of elemental analysis by reducing the necessary components. At the end of his research, he had lowered the minimal amount of substance necessary for the analysis process by a factor of 50. He invited chemists to learn his method of elemental analysis, so that the method was soon widely accepted.

Commemoration
In 1950, the department of the University of Graz where Fritz Pregl had worked was named the Institute of Medical Chemistry and Pregl Laboratory. Streets in Graz, Innsbruck, Vienna and Klagenfurt were named after him. In Slovenia, Pregl Awards have been bestowed annually since 2007 by the National Institute of Chemistry for the research work and for outstanding doctorates. Slovenian pupils are conferred Pregl Recognition Awards, whereas secondary school students are conferred Pregl Citations for excellent results in national competitions in chemistry. A square in Ljubljana is named after Pregl. The Fritz Pregl Prize has been awarded annually since 1931 in chemistry by the Austrian Academy of Sciences from the funds left at its disposal by Pregl.

References

Further reading

External links
  including the Nobel Lecture, December 11, 1923 Quantitative Micro-Analysis of Organic Substances

1869 births
1930 deaths
Austrian chemists
Austrian Nobel laureates
Austro-Hungarian Nobel laureates
Nobel laureates in Chemistry
Scientists from Ljubljana
Slovenian chemists
Slovenian Nobel laureates
Slovenian physiologists
Austrian people of Slovenian descent
Rectors of universities in Austria
People from Ljubljana in health professions